Dušan Lojda (born 8 March 1988) is a Czech tennis player, currently inactive. He was the 2006 US Open – Boys' singles champion for tennis.

He broke into the top 300 in May 2007 but fell out after a week. He reached his career-high ranking of #161 on 26 July 2010.

Performance timeline

Singles

ATP Challenger and ITF Futures Finals

Singles: 29 (19–10)

Doubles: 6 (2–4)

Junior Grand Slam finals

Singles: 1 (1 title)

References

External links
 
 

1988 births
Living people
People from Ivančice
Czech male tennis players
US Open (tennis) junior champions
Grand Slam (tennis) champions in boys' singles
Sportspeople from the South Moravian Region